The 2008–2009 Cyclo-cross Superprestige events and season-long competition takes place between 12 October 2008 and 12 February 2009. Eight events are organised.

Results

Men

Season standings
In each race, the top 15 riders gain points, going from 15 points for the winner decreasing by one point per position to 1 point for the rider finishing in 15th position.

See also
 2008–2009 UCI Cyclo-cross World Cup
 2008–2009 Cyclo-cross Gazet van Antwerpen

External links
 Cyclo-cross.info 
 Official website

S
S
Cyclo-cross Superprestige